Włodzimierz Danek (3 July 1943 – 30 December 2022) was a Polish sports shooter. He competed in the skeet event at the 1968 Summer Olympics.

Danek died on 30 December 2022, at the age of 79.

References

1943 births
2022 deaths
Polish male sport shooters
Olympic shooters of Poland
Shooters at the 1968 Summer Olympics
People from Bochnia
Sportspeople from Lesser Poland Voivodeship